FMC Dockyard Limited is a shipbuilding & ship-repairing company based in Chittagong, Bangladesh owned by the FMC Group. The shipyard constructs various types of vessels, including ocean going multi purpose cargo vessels, passenger vessels & boats, oil tankers, pontoons, barges, fishing trawlers, dredgers, tug boats, container vessels, etc. FMC Dockyard is Situated in the Eastern Bank of the Karnaphuli river in Chittagong, it is an employment source for around 1500+ people; including skilled and semi skilled labors. FMC Dockyard is standing with over 45 acres of land, modernized into a shipyard consisting of all sorts of tech & heavy machinery. More than five hundred marine professionals are also working in the shipyard. Including marine experts, mechanical engineers, electrical engineers, naval architects & experts in other fields. Business strategy of FMC Dockyard is "Diversity for growth and innovation".

History
FMC Dockyard Limited was established in 2009 as a shipbuilding company. FMC Dockyard is the mother company of FMC Group. It is now the largest shipyard of Bangladesh with total areas of 45-Acre premises and it's the only Dockyard of Bangladesh, which has its own forward and backward linkage industry. More than five hundred marine professionals are also working in the shipyard. Including marine experts, mechanical engineers, electrical engineers, naval architects & experts in other fields. Shipbuilding capacities up to 15 000 DWTShip repair capacities up to 30 000 DWT. With necessity of continuous and effective vessels’ operation, it is essential to keep their performance at peak. For this purpose, FMC Dockyard provides various maintenance services which will optimize vessel's efficiency and reduce operating costs. FMC Dockyard offers technical support and assistance in drawing up and managing maintenance programmes.
Mohammad Yasin Chowdhury is the current chairman of FMC Group of companies.

Dockyard facilities

FMC Dockyard utilizes workshops, logistical resources, and equipment for the building of their ships. The yard stands over 45 acres of land, and employs a workforce of over 1500+ all together.

Some of the facilities of FMC Dockyard are following :
 In house Oxygen plant
 Bonded warehouse
 Heavy lifting equipment
 Gantry crane
 Mobile hydraulic crane
 Barge mounted crane
 Dormitory
 Bending shop
 Blasting shop
 CNC (Computer Numerical Control) shop
 Mechanical and Carpentry shop
 Fabrication yard and shed
 Painting shop
 Slipway
 Healthcare facilities

Projects 
FMC Dockyard has built more than 60 ships which includes ocean going multi purpose cargo vessels, passenger vessels & boats, oil tankers, barges, fishing trawlers, dredgers, tug boats, container vessels, ferry and more.

References

External links
 

Shipbuilding companies of Bangladesh
Shipyards of Bangladesh
Manufacturing companies based in Chittagong
Karnaphuli River